The Goobang Creek, a perennial stream of the Lachlan subcatchment, part of the Murrumbidgee catchment of the Murray-Darling basin, is located in the Central West region of New South Wales, Australia.

Course and features
The creek flows generally southwest towards  and then generally west, joined by three minor tributaries before reaching its confluence with the Lachlan River at Condobolin. The creek descends  over its  course.

The Newell Highway crosses the creek near Parkes.

History
Prior to European settlement, the catchment area of the creek was inhabited by the Wiradjuri people.  Major Thomas Mitchell and John Oxley were early explorers in the area. The town of Condobolin was proclaimed in 1859. In the mid-1860s, gold was mined on the creek. The bushranger Ben Hall was shot dead at Goobang Creek in 1865.

Etymology
Goobang is believed to be an Aboriginal word for a species of the acacia tree.

See also

 List of rivers of New South Wales (A-K)
 Rivers of New South Wales

References

External links
 

Tributaries of the Lachlan River
Rivers of New South Wales
Lachlan Shire
Parkes Shire
Forbes Shire